Wesley Herbert Jarvis (born May 30, 1958) is a Canadian former professional ice hockey player. He played in the National Hockey League with four teams between 1979 and 1988, though much of his career was spent in the minor American Hockey League. His cousin, Doug Jarvis, also played in the NHL.

Hockey career
As a youth, Jarvis played in the 1971 Quebec International Pee-Wee Hockey Tournament with a minor ice hockey team from Toronto.

Selected by the Washington Capitals in the 1978 NHL Entry Draft, Jarvis also played for the Minnesota North Stars, Los Angeles Kings, and Toronto Maple Leafs. Jarvis was the winner of the 1978–79 Gary F. Longman Memorial Trophy, which is awarded to the player voted to be most outstanding in his first season in the International Hockey League by the league coaches. During the 1982–83 season, Jarvis won the Phil Esposito Trophy, which is awarded to the leading scorer of the Central Hockey League for the regular season. His last season of professional hockey was in 1989–90 with the Newmarket Saints. Jarvis was the head coach of the Newmarket Hurricanes of the OPJHL and was an assistant coach with the Barrie Colts for three seasons.

Personal life
Now living in Ontario with his wife Darlene and four daughters (Darcie, Corie, Terrie, and Leslie), Jarvis and former NHL teammate Mike Gartner own and run National Training Rinks, a hockey training and instruction facility. He is the uncle of Alex Foster, and cousin of Doug Jarvis.

Career statistics

Regular season and playoffs

References

External links
 
 Profile at hockeydraftcentral.com

1958 births
Living people
Birmingham South Stars players
Canadian ice hockey centres
Hershey Bears players
Los Angeles Kings players
Minnesota North Stars players
Newmarket Saints players
Port Huron Flags players
St. Catharines Saints players
Ice hockey people from Toronto
Sudbury Wolves players
Toronto Maple Leafs players
Washington Capitals draft picks
Washington Capitals players
Windsor Spitfires players